Sarandi may refer to:
Geography
Sarandí, Buenos Aires, a city in Buenos Aires Province, Argentina
Sarandi, Paraná, a municipality in Paraná, Brazil
Sarandi, Rio Grande do Sul, a municipality in Rio Grande do Sul, Brazil
Sarandí del Arapey, a village in the Salto Department of  northwestern Uruguay
Sarandí Grande, a town in the Florida Department of  central Uruguay
Sarandí del Yi, a town in the Durazno Department of  central Uruguay

History
Battle of Sarandí, a battle in the Cisplatine War

Sport
Arsenal de Sarandí, an Argentine football club

Media
CX 8 Radio Sarandí, a Uruguayan radio station

Transport
ARA Sarandí was the name given to 3 ships of the Argentine Navy
Sarandí (1841), a sail corvette of the Uruguayan Navy